Don Murray (June 7, 1904 – June 2, 1929) was an American jazz clarinet and saxophone player.

Early life
Murray was born in Joliet, Illinois, and attended high school in Chicago. In his teens, he made a name for himself as one of the best young jazz clarinetists and saxophonists in the city.

Career 
In 1923, Murray recorded with the New Orleans Rhythm Kings; according to Rhythm Kings leader Paul Mares, Murray was not a regular member of the band, but was a friend who sometimes sat in with them. Murray also made early recordings with Muggsy Spanier. He then joined the Detroit, Michigan based band of Jean Goldkette, with whom he remained until 1927. It was here that he mentored the young Jimmy Dorsey.

After a brief stint with Adrian Rollini's band, during which he contributed to several highly regarded recordings by Bix Beiderbecke, Murray was hired by Ted Lewis. Ted Lewis said that Murray was the greatest clarinetist he ever had in his band. Murray can be heard on the soundtrack of the Ted Lewis film Is Everybody Happy? (1929), which is considered a "lost film."

In 2021, the Bix Beiderbecke Museum and World Archives in Davenport, Iowa, announced that it would raise $12,000 to renovate its permanent exhibit, including Murray's saxophone.

Death 
Murray died in 1929 at a Los Angeles hospital after injuries sustained in an automobile accident. Apparently, he was standing on the running board of a moving roadster and fell; he struck the back of his head on the pavement and was then hospitalized with serious head injury. Murray is buried at the Memorial Park Cemetery in Skokie, Illinois.

References   

American jazz clarinetists
American jazz saxophonists
American male saxophonists
Musicians from Joliet, Illinois
Musicians from Chicago
1904 births
1929 deaths
Dixieland clarinetists
Dixieland saxophonists
20th-century American saxophonists
Jazz musicians from Illinois
20th-century American male musicians
American male jazz musicians
New Orleans Rhythm Kings members